Hurworth is a locality in Taranaki, New Zealand. The settlement was established in the 1850s.

History
Harry Atkinson, the Premier of New Zealand, named Hurworth after a village he had lived in as a child in England. Atkinson contributed to the establishment of the settlement; he built what is now known as "Hurworth Cottage," from what a sawyer had taught him.

Hurworth became one of six thriving settlements, known for its fine cheeses. Other residents included the Ronalds family – five brothers and sisters of Dr Edmund Ronalds. However, many buildings were damaged in the First Taranaki War of 1860. The town was abandoned and residents were forced to move to nearby New Plymouth. Hurworth Cottage was the only building standing in the area after the war in 1861, but its floor had been set afire.

Atkinson did not return to the settlement until 1865. The area afterwards grew into another small community, and in 1967, the cottage was given to the New Zealand Historic Places Trust by its then-owner, Robert Brown. It has since been preserved.

Attractions

The Pouakai Zoo is located in Hurworth and includes lions, (white-coated) tigers, meerkats, tammar wallabies, black-handed spider monkeys and a female lar gibbon.

References

Populated places in Taranaki
New Plymouth District
Heritage New Zealand Category 1 historic places in Taranaki